Mirage is the name of two fictional villains appearing in American comic books published by Marvel Comics.

Publication history

Mirage first appeared in The Amazing Spider-Man #156 and was created by Len Wein and Ross Andru.

Fictional character biography

Desmond Charne

Desmond Charne was a former holography technician who wanted to be a supervillain. To that end, he used holograph technology which could make him invisible or create 3-D illusions. He also became the leader of his own criminal gang at some point.

He made his criminal debut at Betty Brant and Ned Leeds' wedding, intending to rob them and their guests, but Spider-Man interfered. After a lengthy battle, Spider-Man defeated Mirage by dropping a chandelier on him.

Mirage then planned to kidnap the Thing from a hospital, to sell him to the highest bidder. Daredevil prevented Mirage's plans, and defeated him.

Mirage attended the "Bar With No Name" in Medinah County, Ohio and was massacred along with all the other villains present at the incident by the Scourge of the Underworld, sustaining multiple gunshot wounds. He was reported to have survived, as part of a ploy to lure the Scourge into a trap. Dressed as Mirage, Captain America captured Scourge, who was then shot to death by another mysterious assailant. Arnim Zola later created a "proto-husk" replica of him only for it to be killed by Deadpool.

During the "Dark Reign" storyline, Mirage was later among the 18 criminals that were murdered by Scourge of the Underworld to be resurrected by Hood using the power of Dormammu as part of a squad assembled to eliminate the Punisher. Mirage's powers of illusion have been augmented. Lascivious demonstrates her new emotion-based powers on him, making him lick her boots. Mirage disguises himself and a number of the criminals as the Avengers out to kill the Punisher. The Punisher uncovers the ruse when he knocks out Mirage (disguised as Captain America) and captures him. He interrogates Mirage about the villain's plans, and leaves him with a grenade in his mouth. Mirage escapes and Letha removes the grenade. Letha orders Bird-Man to take him to safety. Later, Mirage was in a nightclub when the Punisher attacks him and threatens Mirage to get him to tell him everything he knows about the Microchip's whereabouts, but Mirage was shot by the female assassin before giving the Punisher any information.

Mirage resurfaces at a Super Villains Anonymous meeting, where he elaborates on his origin, and reveals that he had fallen into a coma for three months after being shot. Mirage is then hired on as a member of Boomerang and Owl's Sinister Six teen, a team assembled to distract the Chameleon's forces while Boomerang steals from him. During the battle between the group and the Chameleon's men, Mirage is knocked out and impersonated by the Chameleon, who is in turn knocked out by Boomerang when he sees through the ruse. Afterward, Mirage is shoved off of a building by Boomerang, who had assumed he was a hologram. When Mirage splatters on the ground, the surprised Boomerang reassures himself that Mirage has come back from worse.

During the "Dead No More: The Clone Conspiracy" storyline, Mirage was cloned by Jackal and his company New U Technologies. He was involved in a fight with the other supervillain clones until it was broken up by a clone of Prowler. Mirage later died from clone degeneration.

During the "Damnation" storyline, Mirage is revived when Doctor Strange uses his magic to restore Las Vegas.

During the "Hunted" storyline, Mirage was seen as a patron at the Pop-Up with No Name.

Unnamed
A new character named Mirage has appeared as a Superhuman Registration Act violator. This Mirage is a female. When Mindwave was imprisoned by the Thunderbolts at Thunderbolts Mountain, he began a telepathic conversation with fellow prisoners Caprice, Bluestreak, and Mirage. Mirage informed Mindwave that Penance had a violent dissociative episode and that most of the Thunderbolts were under stress. She also noted that Doc Samson, who was present in Thunderbolts Mountain, had some fascinating thoughts.

Mirage was ordered not to focus on Samson, but she ignored her fellow prisoners to pry into his mind anyway, and this time he noticed her psychic probing. He used his pent-up rage to send some psychic feedback to her that stunned her painfully and broke the connection. Bullseye killed Mirage and her allies in their cells by throwing scalpels into their heads.

Powers and abilities
Desmond Charne was an electronics and laser technology genius, and held a master's degree in physics. He designed a costume of synthetic stretch fabric lined with micro-circuitry and miniature devices with which Mirage could project three-dimensional laser-induced images called holograms. These tiny holographic projectors, located in the costume's cowl, enabled him to disguise himself as others, or to project multiple images, or to project three-dimensional images of himself several yards from his actual location while rendering himself "invisible" by bending light rays appropriately. He also often carried a handgun with a silencer, and a tranquilizer gun.

The second Mirage has telepathic abilities.

Other versions
The Desmond Charne version of Mirage appears as one of the guardians of Krona's stronghold in JLA/Avengers, and as a criminal apprehended by Spider-Man in Spider-Man Loves Mary Jane.

References

External links
 Mirage I at Marvel Wiki
 
 
 Mirage II at Marvel Wiki
 

Characters created by Len Wein
Characters created by Mike Deodato
Characters created by Ross Andru
Characters created by Warren Ellis
Comics characters introduced in 1976
Comics characters introduced in 2007
Fictional physicists
Marvel Comics scientists
Marvel Comics supervillains
Spider-Man characters